Isorineloricaria villarsi is a species of catfish in the family Loricariidae. It is native to South America, where it is known only from Venezuela. The species reaches 32 cm (12.6 inches) in standard length and is believed to be a facultative air-breather.

Isorineloricaria villarsi was originally described as a member of Plecostomus by Christian Frederik Lütken in 1874, although it was subsequently transferred to Hypostomus after Plecostomus was found to be an invalid genus. It was later classified within the now-invalid genus Squaliforma, although a 2016 taxonomic review of the genera Aphanotorulus and Isorineloricaria conducted by Jonathan W. Armbruster (of Auburn University) and C. Keith Ray found it to be a member of Isorineloricaria. FishBase lists the species as Squaliforma villarsi.

References 

Hypostominae
Fish described in 1874
Catfish of South America